The 2015 Open GDF Suez de Cagnes-sur-Mer Alpes-Maritimes was a professional tennis tournament played on outdoor clay courts. It was the eighteenth edition of the tournament and part of the 2015 ITF Women's Circuit, offering a total of $100,000 in prize money. It took place in Cagnes-sur-Mer, France, on 4–10 May 2015.

Singles main draw entrants

Seeds 

 1 Rankings as of 27 April 2015

Other entrants 
The following players received wildcards into the singles main draw:
  Fiona Ferro
  Sharon Fichman
  Mathilde Johansson
  Virginie Razzano

The following players received entry from the qualifying draw:
  Ysaline Bonaventure
  Tamara Korpatsch
  Olivia Rogowska
  Renata Zarazúa

The following player received entry from a protected ranking:
  Tamira Paszek

Champions

Singles

 Carina Witthöft def.  Tatjana Maria, 7–5, 6–1

Doubles

 Johanna Konta /  Laura Thorpe def.  Jocelyn Rae /  Anna Smith, 1–6, 6–4, [10–5]

External links 
 2015 Open GDF Suez de Cagnes-sur-Mer Alpes-Maritimes at ITFtennis.com
 Official website 

2015 ITF Women's Circuit
2015
2015 in French tennis
May 2015 sports events in France